Stone House Mansion, also known as the John Strode House, is a historic home located near Martinsburg, Berkeley County, West Virginia. The main house was built in 1757, and is a two-story, stone house with a slate gable roof. Porches were added during the 20th century. Also on the property is a stuccoed brick ice house (c. 1900), bunk house (1905), and a barn / garage (c. 1910).

It was listed on the National Register of Historic Places in 1994.

References

External links
Stone House Mansion website

Georgian architecture in West Virginia
Houses completed in 1757
Houses in Berkeley County, West Virginia
Houses on the National Register of Historic Places in West Virginia
National Register of Historic Places in Martinsburg, West Virginia
Stone houses in West Virginia